Michael Steven Krangel is an American immunologist. He is the Mary Bernheim Distinguished Professor of Immunology in the Department of Immunology at the Duke University School of Medicine. In 2010, Krangel was appointed chair of the Department of Immunology at Duke University School of Medicine.

Krangel served as the first co-Editor-in-Chief of ImmunoHorizons with Leslie J. Berg from 2017 to 2019.

References

External links

Living people
Harvard University faculty
American immunologists
Harvard University alumni
Duke University School of Medicine faculty
Academic journal editors
Year of birth missing (living people)